Alexander Scriabin's  Symphony No. 3 in C minor (Op. 43), entitled Le Divin Poème (The Divine Poem), was written between 1902 and 1904 and published in 1905. It was premiered in Paris on 29 May of that year.

Structure 
The symphony consists of four sections, proceeding without pause:

Instrumentation
 Woodwinds: Piccolo, 3 Flutes, 3 Oboes, English horn, 3 Clarinets (in B-flat), Bass Clarinet (in B-flat), 3 Bassoons, Contrabassoon
 Brass: 8 Horns (in F), 5 Trumpets (in B-flat), 3 Trombones, Tuba
 Percussion: Timpani, Tam-Tam, Cymbals, Bells, Triangle
 Strings: 16 First and 16 Second Violins, 12 Violas, 12 Violoncellos, 8 Double Basses (numbers stipulated by Scriabin in the score), 2 Harps

Performance on the piano
Leonid Sabaneyev mentions that this symphony is much clearer when performed on the piano. He cites a pupil of Sergei Taneyev with the words: One has to hear how Alexander Nikolayevich [Scriabin] himself plays this symphony on the piano, he made of it a kind of Poème for piano. The impression is unforgettable, and it sounds much better than with an orchestra.

This symphony has also been transcribed for piano duet by Leon Conus in 1905.

Le Divin Poème was premiered by Arthur Nikisch in Paris on 29 May 1905 at Le Théâtre Châtelet.

References

External links
 

Symphonies by Alexander Scriabin
1904 compositions
Compositions in C minor